Argo Jati is a train service operated by  Indonesian Railway Company (PT Kereta Api Indonesia) between Jakarta and Cirebon in Java, Indonesia. This train was relaunched on November 3, 2010, as a replacement train series of Argo Jati, which was launched in 2007.

History

Launching of operation (2007-2010)
The launch of Argo for this line had been discussed, given the demand and the decline in the prestige argo class of Cirebon Express, which was inaugurated on May 13, 2005. Argo Jati was launched on April 12, 2007, as an improvised/improved service of the Cirebon Express train. The train 1995 series of executive trains previously used by the Argo Gede train. The name Argo, as stated in PT KAI's service class, is a brand image of executive class service, and Jati has taken from a Walisongo figure who succeeded in spreading Islam in Java, Sunan Gunung Jati.

Relaunching (2010-present)
The enthusiasm of the people of Cirebon and surrounding areas for executive-class train services is increasing, so PT KAI seeks to improve the services of the executive class with the direction of Gambir station and Cirebon station. The relaunch of the Argo Jati train with the name "New Argo Jati" was then held on November 3, 2010, as a replacement for the old Argo Jati train service. At present, the CC206 locomotive officially replaces CC 203 35, while the CC 203 35 is used as one of the mainstay locomotives of the Krakatau Ekspres train.

Train formation and facilities 
There is a diverse set of trains destined for Argo Jati :

After inauguration Argo Jati train was using 2010 model executive train. Then since 2010 Argo Jati train had been using a new set of executive coaches. Starting 29 October 2018, the train has been using the stainless steel train Series made in 2018. Each train coach is equipped with a manual information digitally train sequence. There is also a  running text , which can determine the speed of trains, stations and time signature.  Equipped with TV, air conditioner, an outlet, a secure luggage, and toilet. Seats are reclining with each seat has luggage space, power charging point and reading light above, with curtain at the window side. Free Wi-Fi available at dining coach.

Route, Schedule and Fare 
Argo Jati train departs from the Cirebon Station and only stop at Jatibarang Station, Bekasi Station, Jatinegara Station and end the journey at Gambir Station. The train runs twice daily in each direction on the route ––––, with an additional facultative train on special occasions. Train fare is Rp. 140,000 - 185,000, depending on the distance, class and seating position in the train carriage, as well as certain days, such as weekends and public holidays.

See also 

 PT Kereta Api
 Rail transport in Indonesia
 List of named passenger trains of Indonesia

References

Passenger rail transport in Indonesia